Hot Date is an American comedy television series created by, and starring, Emily Axford and Brian K. Murphy. The series premiered on Pop on November 8, 2017. On January 30, 2019, the series was renewed for a second season which premiered on September 20, 2019.

Cast 
Emily Axford as Emily
Brian K. Murphy as Murph
Will Arnett as Sam Keurig
Kevin Pollak as Father
John Albaugh as Tucker
Carisa Barreca as Sue
Alison Becker as Libby
Joel Boyd as Bernard
Brooke Breit as Tawney
Bria Cloyd as Nikki
Brianne Fitzpatrick as Kara
Jon Gabrus as Luke
Patrick Gough as Travis
Terence Bernie Hines as James
Alison Banowsky as Ivy 
Ben Schwartz as Ian
Japhet Balaban as Nick
Ashlyn Hughes as Caitlin
Erin Long as Kiki
Vernon Mina as Lorne
Kiley B. Moore as Ginny
Scott Morehead as Cooper
Cody Reiss as Gordo
David Smith as Jaden
Tien Tran as Laura
Travis Turner as Mike
Kimberly Michelle Vaughn as Rachel
Jenna Kanell as Erin

Episodes

Season 1 (2017–18)

Season 2 (2019)

References

External links

2010s American sketch comedy television series
2017 American television series debuts
2019 American television series endings
English-language television shows
Pop (American TV channel) original programming
Television shows set in Illinois
Television shows set in Louisiana